The Last One Standing is the second album by Canadian folk-pop singer Christine Fellows, released in 2002 on Six Shooter Records.

Track listing
 Regrets
 Roadkill
 Veda's Waltz
 Seconds After
 Lost Overtures
 2 for 1 (Part 2)
 Blueprints
 Trust
 A Day in the Road
 Surgery
 Bird as Prophet
 The Last One Standing
 Surprise!

2002 albums
Christine Fellows albums
Six Shooter Records albums